Slapp Happy (also known as Casablanca Moon) is a studio album by German/British avant-pop group Slapp Happy, recorded at Virgin Records' Manor Studio in 1974.

This album was originally recorded in 1973 in Germany under a working title of Casablanca Moon with Faust as Slapp Happy's backing band, but Polydor Records in Germany rejected it. After moving to London and signing with Virgin Records, Slapp Happy re-recorded the album (at Virgin's request) with session musicians under the direction of violinist , and with new arrangements of the songs by Roger Wootton of Comus. Virgin released the album in 1974 as Slapp Happy. A second UK pressing of the album used the title Casablanca Moon on the label (though not on the cover). Later CD reissues officially used the title Casablanca Moon.

In 1980 Recommended Records released the original recording (with Faust) as Acnalbasac Noom (Casablanca Moon with the words written backwards).

Reception

Reviewing the album at AllMusic, Richie Unterberger wrote that Slapp Happy's songwriting here is better than on their first album, Sort Of. It has "witty and oddball" lyrics that are not "pretentious", and are showcased by Krause's German-inflected singing. Unterberger compared some of the tracks on the album to Yoko Ono's 1970s songs, but felt that "Krause's vocals are much better than Ono's, while just as distinctive." Writing in The Rough Guide to Rock, Mark Ellingham noted: "Slapp Happy found themselves at Virgin's Manor studios, recording the album with a virtual chamber orchestra of musicians."

In a 1974 review in Audio, Carl Anthony said Slapp Happy has "[s]ome of the most extraordinary lyrics I've heard in a long time", and when they are sung by Krause in her "[h]aunting" voice, the deceptively "normal" music is transformed into "something surreal and distant", "alien but strangely inviting". He described the recording of the album as "clean and open" with "clear and well projected" vocals. Anthony added that Slapp Happy "is no ordinary group" and opined that they are "going to be big – no question of it".

Track listing
All music composed by Anthony Moore and Peter Blegvad, except where noted.

Personnel
Sources: Peter Blegvad, Discogs
Dagmar Krause (credited as "Dagmar") – lead vocals
Peter Blegvad – second vocals, guitar (uncredited)
Anthony Moore – keyboards

Guests
Marc Singer – drums
Dave Wintour – bass guitar
 – violin, mandolin
Roger Wootton – backing vocals
Eddie Sparrow –  drums, congas, whistles, etc.
Jean Hervé Peron – bass guitar
Clare Deniz – cello
Nick Worters – double bass
Jeremy Baines – sausage bassoon
Andy Leggett – jugs
Clem Cattini – drums
Henry Lowther – trumpet
Geoff Leigh – saxophones
Keshave Sathe – tablas, tamboura

Sound and art work
Slapp Happy – producers
Steve Morse – producer
Simon Heyworth – mixer, engineer
Steve Taylor – mixer, engineer
David Larcher – cover photograph
Carol Aitken – cover design

CD reissues
In 1993 Virgin Records reissued Slapp Happy as Casablanca Moon together with Slapp Happy's Desperate Straights on CD.

References

External links
Peter Blegvad Discography
Slapp Happy: Casablanca Moon/Desperate Straights (archived 26 October 2009)

Works cited

1974 albums
Slapp Happy albums
Virgin Records albums
Avant-pop albums